The 2015–16 OK Liga Femenina was the eighth edition of Spain's premier women's rink hockey championship.

CP Voltregà won its fifth title and tenth overall including the defunct Spanish Championship.

Teams

League table

Copa de la Reina

The 2016 Copa de la Reina was the 11th edition of the Spanish women's roller hockey cup. As in the previous two years, it was played in Lloret de Mar between the eight first qualified teams after the first half of the season.

Hostelcur Gijón won its third trophy by defeating Generali Palau de Plegamans in the penalty shootout.

References

External links
Official Spanish Federation website

2015 in roller hockey
2016 in roller hockey
OK Liga Femenina seasons